The 2004 IAAF World Race Walking Cup was held on 1 and 2 May 2004 in the streets of Naumburg, Germany.
Detailed reports on the event and an appraisal of the results was given for the IAAF.

Complete results were published.

Medallists

Results

Men's 20 km

Team (20 km Men)

Men's 50 km

Team (50 km Men)

Men's 10 km (Junior)

Team (10 km Men Junior)

Women's 20 km

Team (20km Women)

Women's 10 km Junior

Team (10km Women Junior)

Participation
The participation of 424 athletes (272 men/152 women) from 54 countries is reported.

 (8/3)
 (11/8)
 (11/8)
 (3/-)
 (1/1)
 (3/3)
 (1/-)
 (2/-)
 (3/-)
 (13/8)
 (4/2)
 (4/2)
 (3/-)
 (6/3)
 (1/4)
 (1/-)
 (1/1)
 (12/8)
 (11/7)
 (4/8)
 (2/2)
 (10/3)
 (5/2)
 (12/5)
 (1/3)
 (6/-)
 (7/4)
 (1/1)
 (3/1)
 (7/4)
 (1/-)
 (1/2)
 (3/-)
 (9/3)
 (10/5)
 (1/-)
 (3/-)
 (3/6)
 (13/8)
 (3/-)
 (8/2)
 (1/-)
 (2/2)
 (5/2)
 (13/8)
 (-/1)
 (6/1)
 (2/2)
 (2/-)
 (1/-)
 (2/1)
 (7/5)
 (5/3)
 (13/8)

References

External links
Official IAAF website for the 2004 IAAF World Race Walking Cup
Results - IAAF.org

World Athletics Race Walking Team Championships
World Race Walking Cup
World Race Walking Cup
World Race Walking Cup